1755 Lorbach, provisional designation , is a stony Eoan asteroid from the outer region of the asteroid belt, approximately 25 kilometers in diameter.

It was discovered on 8 November 1936, by French astronomer Marguerite Laugier at Nice Observatory in southeastern France, and named after Anne Lorbach Herget, wife of astronomer Paul Herget.

Classification and orbit 

Lorbach is a member of the Eos family, the largest asteroid family in the outer main belt consisting of nearly 10,000 asteroids. It orbits the Sun at a distance of 2.9–3.2 AU once every 5 years and 5 months (1,986 days). Its orbit has an eccentricity of 0.05 and an inclination of 11° with respect to the ecliptic. The body's observation arc, however, begins 2 days after its official discovery observation at Nice in 1936.

Physical characteristics 

According to the survey carried out by NASA's Wide-field Infrared Survey Explorer with its subsequent NEOWISE mission, Lorbach measures 24.88 kilometers in diameter, and its surface has an albedo of 0.140. It is a stony S-type asteroid on the Tholen taxonomic scheme, and has an absolute magnitude of 10.77. As of 2017, Lorbachs spectral type, rotation period and shape remain unknown.

Naming 

This minor planet was named after the maiden name of American Anne Lorbach Herget, second wife of astronomer Paul Herget, after whom the minor planet 1751 Herget is named. Anne worked as an assistant at the Cincinnati Observatory since the 1960s, key-punching MPC-data and assigning provisional designations to minor planets. The official  was published by the Minor Planet Center on 1 August 1978.

References

External links 
 Asteroid Lightcurve Database (LCDB), query form (info )
 Dictionary of Minor Planet Names, Google books
 Asteroids and comets rotation curves, CdR – Observatoire de Genève, Raoul Behrend
 Discovery Circumstances: Numbered Minor Planets (1)-(5000) – Minor Planet Center
 
 

001755
Discoveries by Marguerite Laugier
Named minor planets
001755
19361108